Donald D. Avenson (September 16, 1944 – May 19, 2017) was an American politician in the state of Iowa.

Early life 
Avenson was born on September 16, 1944, in Minneapolis, Minnesota to Donald C. and Wilma G. Avenson. The family lived in Oelwein, Iowa, and he graduated from Oelwein Community High School in 1962.

On August 1, 1964, he married Diane Mary Duda and the couple had three children. Avenson attended the University of Wisconsin–River Falls, receiving his bachelor's degree in political science and history in 1970, and completed his graduate studies in history at the University of Northern Iowa.

Political career 
Avenson worked at the Oelwein Tool & Die Company. He served in the Iowa House of Representatives from 1973 to 1991, as a Democrat. He unsuccessfully ran for governor in 1990, losing to Terry Branstad.

Later life 
Avenson died in Great Plains Medical Center in North Platte, Nebraska on May 19, 2017, from a heart attack. He was 72 years old.

References

1944 births
2017 deaths
Politicians from Minneapolis
People from Oelwein, Iowa
University of Northern Iowa alumni
University of Wisconsin–Madison alumni
Democratic Party members of the Iowa House of Representatives